Two Comrades Were Serving (translit. Sluzhili dva tovarishcha) is a 1968 Soviet war film directed by Yevgeny Karelov with a script by Yuli Dunsky and Valeri Frid. The film is about the Russian civil war, in particular, the battle for the Crimean peninsula.

Plot 
Two comrades and soldiers of the Red Army, Andrei Nekrasov (O. Yankovsky) and Ivan Karyakin (R. Bykov) were sent by their regimental commander (A. Papanov) on a reconnaissance mission to film the White Army fortifications on the way into Crimea (Perekop). After filming, the engine on their airplane stalled and they were forced to land in unfriendly territory.

As the culmination of a series of misadventures, the friends were going to be executed as spies by their own side. The Colonel appears in time to stop the firing squad.

The second part of the film narrates the assault on Perekop and the Red Army invasion of the Crimea.

The film also features Vladimir Vysotsky as Brusentsov, a cynical and disillusioned officer in Wrangel's Army. He shot Nekrasov down at the end of the film. Karyakin hums his friend's favorite song - "The bullet whizzed and aha!..". Vysotsky's character later shot himself during the Evacuation to Constantinople.

The film's focus is the friendship between two decidedly different characters. Nekrasov is intelligent and war-weary, while Karyakin is simple-minded, yet idealistic and energetic.

Cast
Oleg Yankovsky as Andrei Nekrasov
Rolan Bykov as Ivan Karyakin
Anatoli Papanov as regiment commander
Nikolai Kryuchkov as platoon commander
Alla Demidova as Commissar
Vladimir Vysotsky as Alexander Brusentsov
Iya Savvina as Alexandra
Nikolai Burlyayev as Sergey Lukashevich
Pyotr Krylov as chief of staff
Rostislav Yankovsky as Colonel Vasilchikov
Roman Tkachuk as White Guard officer
Nikolai Parfyonov as White Guard officer
Juozas Budraitis as  member of  Red Staff
 Veniamin Smekhov as Baron Krause

Production 

The theme song was included on Lubeh's 1995 album, Kombat.

References

External links

1968 films
1960s war comedy-drama films
Russian Civil War films
Films set in 1920
Films set in Crimea
Soviet black-and-white films
Soviet war comedy-drama films
Mosfilm films
1960s Russian-language films
Vladimir Vysotsky